Domitia cervina is a species of beetle in the family Cerambycidae. It was described by Hintz in 1913.

References

Lamiini
Beetles described in 1913